Stephanocleonus plumbeus is a species of cylindrical weevil in the beetle family Curculionidae. It is found in North America. It was found in 1876 by LeConte.

References

Further reading

 
 

Lixinae
Articles created by Qbugbot
Beetles described in 1876